The 2021 Faroe Islands Cup is the 67th edition of the Faroe Islands domestic football cup. It started on 10 April and is scheduled to end on 6 December. Havnar Bóltfelag are the defending champions.

Only the first teams of the participating clubs were allowed to enter the competition.

The final will be broadcast by Kringvarp Føroya, and streamed worldwide.

Round and draw dates

Preliminary round

First round

Quarterfinals

Semifinals

Summary

Matches

Final

 B36 Tórshavn won after a penalty shoot-out.

References

External links
Faroe Islands Cup on soccerway
 

Faroe Islands Cup seasons
Faroe Islands Cup
Faroe Islands Cup